Manila by Night, also known as City After Dark, is a controversial 1980 Filipino film directed by Ishmael Bernal and starring Gina Alajar and Charito Solis. Released at the height of the Marcos regime, the film uncovers the other face of Manila by depicting the ugly aspects of life in the city – unemployment, prostitution, drug addiction and lack of decent housing. Considered one of Bernal's masterpieces, it is an epic multi-narrative of people who have shady pasts and are trying to exist in an unforgiving world.

Synopsis
The film's events take place in the course of several nights, involving various protagonists and the city itself.

Cast

Production 
Lily Monteverde of Regal Films approached Ishmael Bernal to direct a large-scale production to commemorate the second anniversary of the production outfit. Bernal had previously directed Salahawan for Monteverde's Regal Films. For the production, Bernal came up with a sequence list, based on different locales, but decided to have the scenes improvised by a cast assembled from Regal Film's stable, as well as industry friends.

Restoration
The film was restored in 4K resolution by the Philippine Film Archive, the film archives division of the Film Development Council of the Philippines, and Central Digital Lab as part of the "Save Our Cinema Restoation Program". The restored version was premiered as part of the Pista ng Pelikulang Pilipino 2020 exhibition.

Reception

Critical response
The movie's original title is Manila by Night, but was later renamed to City After Dark. Former first lady Imelda Marcos asked it to be changed and banned for export. Marcos believes that the movie "maligns her city". The said movie was Ishmael Bernal's masterpiece. The characters are unique and realistic. The whole movie celebrates the night life in the streets of Manila, with the characters revolving around hookers, bisexuals, dope addicts and criminals.

Accolades

References

External links

1980 films
1980s fantasy drama films
Films set in Manila
Regal Entertainment films
1980s Tagalog-language films
Philippine fantasy drama films
1980 drama films
Films directed by Ishmael Bernal